Marvin R. Goldfried (born 1936) is an American psychologist. His area of interest includes LGBT issues and psychotherapy integration.

Early life 
Marvin Goldfried was born in 1936 in Brooklyn to parents from Eastern Europe. He was the first in his family to pursue education past high school. He majored in psychology at Brooklyn College. He completed graduate education in clinical psychology at University at Buffalo. During his graduate studies, he completed a summer internship at the VA Palo Alto Health Care System. He earned his degree in 1961.

Career 
Goldfried joined the faculty at University of Rochester in 1961. In 1964, he joined the psychology department at Stony Brook University and worked on developing a graduate program in clinical psychology. Goldfried studies LGBT issues, psychotherapy research, and psychotherapy integration. He is a distinguished professor of clinical psychology at Stony Brook University. He is a co-founder of the Society for the Exploration of Psychotherapy Integration. Goldfried is the founding editor of In Session: Psychotherapy in Practice. He is a former president of the Society for Psychotherapy Research. He founded AFFIRM: Psychologists Affirming their LGBT Family which comprises a network of family members in psychology with LGBT relatives that encourages research, clinical work, education, and advocacy.

Awards and honors 
Goldfried received the 2018 Gold Medal Award for Life Achievement in the Application of Psychology from the American Psychological Foundation.

Personal life 
Goldfried is married to Anita and together they have two sons. He lived with his wife and first son in Jerusalem in 1970 while he was on sabbatical. In 1999, he announced that one of his sons was gay.

See also 

 LGBTQ psychology

References 

1936 births
People from Brooklyn
Scientists from New York City
20th-century American scientists
21st-century American scientists
20th-century American psychologists
21st-century American psychologists
Brooklyn College alumni
University at Buffalo alumni
University of Rochester faculty
Stony Brook University faculty
American people of Eastern European descent
Living people